Time and Chance is an Australian novel by Alma Timms. It was the twelfth in the Great South Land Saga of novels originally started by E. V. Timms. He died while writing the 11th, which his wife Alma completed; she then wrote the final instalment.

Plot
The Gubbys return to England to visit Mary Ann.

References

External links
Time and Chance at AustLit

1971 Australian novels
Angus & Robertson books